is a railway station in the city of Sōja, Okayama Prefecture, Japan, operated by West Japan Railway Company (JR West). It is located in the former village of Kiyone, which was merged with the expanded city of Sōja in March 2005.

Lines
Kiyone Station is served by the JR West Hakubi Line and also the Ibara Railway Ibara Line

Station layout

Kiyone Station has two platforms capable of handling five trains simultaneously. Each platform has an upper and lower end.

Platforms

Adjacent stations
JR West Hakubi Line
Kurashiki Station — Kiyone Station — Sōja Station
Ibara Railway Ibara Line
Sōja Station — Kiyone Station — Kawabejuku Station

History
The station opened on 17 February 1925. With the privatization of Japanese National Railways (JNR) on 1 April 1987, the station came under the control of JR West.

In January 1999, the Ibara Railway Ibara Line opened connecting Sōja, Kiyone, and Kannabe Stations.

Surrounding area
The Takahashi River flows near Kiyone Station.

 National Route 486
 Okayama Prefectural Route 24 (Kurashiki-Kiyone Route)
 Okayama Prefectural Route 189 (Kiyone Teishajō Route)
 Okayama Prefectural Route 270 (Kiyone-Makane Route)

See also
List of Railway Stations in Japan

External links
 JR West station information 

Railway stations in Japan opened in 1925
Hakubi Line
Ibara Railway Ibara Line
Railway stations in Okayama Prefecture
Kurashiki